Alejandra Marina Oliveras (born March 20, 1978), known as "La Locomotora", is an Argentine boxer. She is the former WBC female super lightweight, WBO World female featherweight and  WBA World female lightweight champion.

She was born in El Carmen, Jujuy.

Boxing career
January 5, 2012, Alejandra Oliveras won by a KO against Jessica Villafranca. The two were fighting for the vacant WBO featherweight world title.

On 2013 April 19, Oliveras on her 5th defense of the featherweight title defeated Calixta Silgado on the fifth round by KO.

Alejandra Marina Oliveras lost her title, WBC light welterweight, on November 15, 2014, after being defeated by Erica Farias by split decision.

Professional boxing record

{|class="wikitable" style="text-align:center; font-size:95%"
|-
!Result
!Record
!Opponent
!Type
!Round, time
!Date
!Location
!Notes
|-
|Win||32-3-2||align=left| Natalia del Valle Aguirre
|
|
|
|align=left|
|align=left|
|- align=center
|Loss||31-3-2||align=left| Erica Farias
|
|
|
|align=left|
|align=left|
|- align=center
|Win||31-2-2||align=left| Lely Luz Florez
|
|
|
|align=left|
|align=left|
|- align=center
|Win||30-2-2||align=left| Calixta Silgado
|
|
|
|align=left|
|align=left|
|- align=center
|Win||29-2-2||align=left| Dayana Cordero
|
|
|
|align=left|
|align=left|
|- align=center
|Win||28-2-2||align=left| Paulina Cardona
|
|
|
|align=left|
|align=left|
|- align=center
|Win||27-2-2||align=left| Migdalia Asprilla
|
|
|
|align=left|
|align=left|
|- align=center
|Win||26-2-2||align=left| Diana Ayala
|
|
|
|align=left|
|align=left|
|- align=center
|Win||25-2-2||align=left| Simone Da Silva Duarte
|
|
|
|align=left|
|align=left|
|- align=center
|Win||24-2-2||align=left| Jessica Villafranca
|
|
|
|align=left|
|align=left|
|- align=center
|Win||23-2-2||align=left| Roxana Beatriz Laborde
|
|
|
|align=left|
|align=left|
|- align=center
|Win||22-2-2||align=left| Liliana Palmera
|
|
|
|align=left|
|align=left|
|- align=center
|Win||21-2-2||align=left| Alicia Susana Alegre
|
|
|
|align=left|
|align=left|
|- align=center
|Win||20-2-2||align=left| Pamela Elizabeth Benavidez
|
|
|
|align=left|
|align=left|
|- align=center
|Loss||19-2-2||align=left| Monica Silvina Acosta
|
|
|
|align=left|
|align=left|
|- align=center
|Win||19-1-2||align=left| Silvia Fernanda Zacarias
|
|
|
|align=left|
|align=left|
|- align=center
|Win||18-1-2||align=left| Sonia Edith Paladino
|
|
|
|align=left|
|align=left|
|- align=center
|Win||17-1-2||align=left| Maria Eugenia Quiroga
|
|
|
|align=left|
|align=left|
|- align=center
|Win||16-1-2||align=left| Antonina Ayala Vazquez
|
|
|
|align=left|
|align=left|
|- align=center
|Win||15-1-2||align=left| Silvia Beatriz Lescano
|
|
|
|align=left|
|align=left|
|- align=center
|Win||14-1-2||align=left| Natalia del Pilar Burga
|
|
|
|align=left|
|align=left|
|- align=center
|Win||13-1-2||align=left| Adriana Salles
|
|
|
|align=left|
|align=left|
|- align=center
|Loss||12-1-2||align=left| Marcela Acuña
|
|
|
|align=left|
|align=left|
|- align=center
|Win||12-0-2||align=left| Michelle Larissa Bonassoli
|
|
|
|align=left|
|align=left|
|- align=center
|Win||11-0-2||align=left| Maria del Carmen Montiel
|
|
|
|align=left|
|align=left|
|- align=center
|Win||10-0-2||align=left| Adriana Salles
|
|
|
|align=left|
|align=left|
|- align=center
|Draw||9-0-2||align=left| Jackie Nava
|
|
|
|align=left|
|align=left|
|- align=center
|Win||9-0-1||align=left| Claudia Andrea Lopez
|
|
|
|align=left|
|align=left|
|- align=center
|Win||8-0-1||align=left| Anays Cecilia Gutierrez Carrillo
|
|
|
|align=left|
|align=left|
|- align=center
|Win||7-0-1||align=left| Jackie Nava
|
|
|
|align=left|
|align=left|
|- align=center
|Win||6-0-1||align=left| Graciela Baez
|
|
|
|align=left|
|align=left|
|- align=center
|Draw||5-0-1||align=left| Betina Gabriela Garino
|
|
|
|align=left|
|align=left|
|- align=center
|Win||5-0||align=left| Betina Gabriela Garino
|
|
|
|align=left|
|align=left|
|- align=center

References

External links

1978 births
Living people
Super-bantamweight boxers
Featherweight boxers
Lightweight boxers
Light-welterweight boxers
World super-bantamweight boxing champions
World featherweight boxing champions
World lightweight boxing champions
World light-welterweight boxing champions
World Boxing Association champions
World Boxing Council champions
World Boxing Organization champions
Argentine women boxers
Sportspeople from Jujuy Province